Mesabolone, also known as 1-testosterone 17β-methoxycyclopentyl ether, is a synthetic anabolic–androgenic steroid (AAS) that was never marketed. It is the 17β-(1-methoxycyclohexane) ether of 1-testosterone (dihydroboldenone).

Side effects

Chemistry

Synthesis
Syntheses of mesabolone have been published.

References 

Abandoned drugs
Androgen ethers
Androgens and anabolic steroids
Androstanes
Enones
Prodrugs